Choi Seong-deok (born 31 May 1999) is a South Korean rugby sevens player. He competed in the men's tournament at the 2020 Summer Olympics.

Choi represented South Korea at the 2022 Rugby World Cup Sevens in Cape Town, South Africa.

References

External links
 

1999 births
Living people
Male rugby sevens players
Olympic rugby sevens players of South Korea
Rugby sevens players at the 2020 Summer Olympics
Place of birth missing (living people)